James Goldman (June 30, 1927 – October 28, 1998) was an American playwright and screenwriter. He won an Academy Award for his screenplay The Lion in Winter (1968).  His younger brother was novelist and screenwriter William Goldman.

Biography
The first son of a Jewish family in Chicago, Illinois, Goldman grew up primarily in Highland Park, Illinois, a Chicago suburb. He is most noted as the author of the screenplay for The Lion in Winter (1968), for which he received an Academy Award. He also wrote the book for the Broadway musical Follies (1971), which was nominated for a Tony Award.

He attended the University of Chicago and Columbia University, earning a master’s degree and studying music criticism. In 1952, Goldman was drafted into the U.S. Army. After his discharge in 1954, he pursued a career as a playwright.

Goldman died in 1998 from a heart attack in New York City. He had lived there for many years.

Works

Plays
 Blood, Sweat and Stanley Poole (1961), with William Goldman
 They Might Be Giants (1961), London
 A Family Affair (1962), musical, book only (lyrics by William Goldman, music by John Kander)
 The Lion in Winter (1966, revived 1999)
 Follies (1971, revived 2001 and 2011), musical, book only (lyrics and music by Stephen Sondheim), Tony Nomination for Best Book of a Musical
 Oliver Twist (1982)
 Anna Karenina (1985)
 Anastasia: The Mystery of Anna (1986)
 Follies in Concert (1986), musical
 Tolstoy (1996)

Screenplays
 The Lion in Winter (1968)
 They Might Be Giants (1971) 
 Nicholas and Alexandra (1971)
 Robin and Marian (1976)
 White Nights (1985)

Television
 Evening Primrose (1966), book only (music and lyrics by Stephen Sondheim)

Novels
 Waldorf (1965)
 The Man From Greek and Roman (1974)
 Myself as Witness (1979)
 Fulton County (1989)

References

External links

1927 births
1998 deaths
American male screenwriters
American musical theatre librettists
People from Highland Park, Illinois
Writers from Chicago
Jewish American screenwriters
20th-century American novelists
20th-century American dramatists and playwrights
Best Adapted Screenplay Academy Award winners
American male novelists
Writers of historical fiction set in the Middle Ages
American male dramatists and playwrights
Novelists from Illinois
Screenwriters from Illinois
20th-century American male writers
20th-century American screenwriters
Columbia University alumni
20th-century American Jews
University of Chicago alumni